The Stony Brook Grist Mill is a Registered Historic Place property in Stony Brook, Suffolk County, New York.  Its construction in 1699 created the Mill Pond astride the Brookhaven-Smithtown boundary. The mill structure itself dates back to at least circa 1751.

Today the Ward Melville Heritage Organization owns and operates the mill as a working mill museum.

References

External links

Ward Melville Heritage Organization: Stony Brook Grist Mill
Stony Brook Village website
New York Times, December 13, 1992, " Stony Brook Gristmill Is Grinding Again"

Brookhaven, New York
Grinding mills on the National Register of Historic Places in New York (state)
Museums in Suffolk County, New York
Mill museums in New York (state)
Grinding mills in New York (state)
National Register of Historic Places in Suffolk County, New York
1699 establishments in the Thirteen Colonies
Buildings and structures completed in 1699